Afroclinocera is a genus of flies in the family Empididae.

Species
A. obesa Sinclair, 1999
A. pecki Sinclair, 1999

References

Empidoidea genera
Empididae